World's on Fire is the first live album and second DVD by English electronic dance music band the Prodigy, released on 11 May 2011.

In October 2011, it was awarded a gold certification from the Independent Music Companies Association (IMPALA), which indicated sales in excess of 75,000 copies throughout Europe.

Track listing

DVD and Blu-ray bonus content

 "Run (Brixton, London)"
 "Spitfire / Mescaline (Brazil)"
 "Breathe (Slane Castle, Ireland)"
 "Poison (Glastonbury, England)"
 "Warning (T in the Park , Scotland)"
 "Japanese film"
 "Voodoo (Bestival and Paris, France)"
 "USA film"
 "UK arena tour film"
 "Smack My Bitch Up (Isle of Wight to Download, England)" (video)

Personnel

The Prodigy
 Keith Flint - vocals
 Maxim Reality - MC, vocals
 Liam Howlett - synthesizers, programming

Additional musicians
 Rob Holliday - guitar, bass, keyboards
 Leo Crabtree - drums, electronic drums

Charts

References 

2011 live albums
2011 video albums
Live video albums
The Prodigy albums